Kvinesdal is a municipality in Agder county, Norway. It is located in the traditional district of Lister. The administrative centre of the municipality is the village of Liknes. Other villages in Kvinesdal include Feda, Fjotland, and Storekvina.

Kvinesdal is an elongated mountain-to-coast municipality, reaching saltwater at the head of the Fedafjorden, which provides access to the North Sea in the south. Further north, the landscape is cut by narrow valleys with scattered small villages. There are also abandoned mines at Knaben, a popular ski resort. Because Kvinesdal resembles the geography of the nation as a whole, it is often referred to as "Little Norway".

The  municipality is the 121st largest by area out of the 356 municipalities in Norway. Kvinesdal is the 161st most populous municipality in Norway with a population of 5,883.

Kvinesdal belongs to a central area in the Norwegian south from which many people emigrated to North America, particularly the United States, from the 1850s until the 1950s. It is noted for being an "American village" (Norwegian: Amerika-bygd) because of the high number of American residents. These are typically either Norwegians who moved to the States, obtained US Citizenship and later moved back to Norway, or are descendants of Norwegians who have never acquired Norwegian citizenship.

General information

The parish of Kvinesdal was established as a municipality on 1 January 1838 (see formannskapsdistrikt law). In 1841, the neighboring municipality of Fjotland (population: 980) was merged with Kvinesdal to form a new, larger municipality of Kvinesdal, although this was short-lived. In 1858, the merger was un-done and Fjotland became a separate municipality once again. After the split, Kvinesdal had 4,485 residents.

On 1 January 1900, the municipality of Kvinesdal was divided into two: the municipality of Feda in the far southern part (population: 1,090) and the municipality of Liknes in the northern part (population: 2,937). The name of Liknes municipality was changed (back) to Kvinesdal in 1917. During the 1960s, there were many municipal mergers across Norway due to the work of the Schei Committee. On 1 January 1963, the municipalities of Fjotland (population: 1,244), Feda (population: 576), and Kvinesdal (population: 3,218) were merged to form one large municipality of Kvinesdal.

Name
The first element is the genitive case of the fjord name Hvínir (now called the Fedafjorden) and the last element is dalr which means "valley" or "dale". The name of the fjord is derived from the river name Hvín (now Kvina), and that name is derived from the verb hvína which means "squeal". During the period from 1900 to 1917, the municipality was named Liknes.

Coat of arms
The coat of arms was granted on 15 March 1985. The official blazon is "Azure a pall engrailed argent". This means the arms have a blue field (background) and the charge is a Y-shaped figure called a pall with edges that are engrailed. The pall has a tincture of argent which means it is commonly colored white, but if it is made out of metal, then silver is used. The blue color in the field and the pall design was chosen to symbolize the meeting of the two local rivers: Kvina and Litleåna which join at the village of Liknes and then flow south together to the Fedafjorden. The arms were designed by Truls Nygaard who developed it using ideas by Hans Freddy Larsen and Lars Olsen.

Churches
The Church of Norway has three parishes within the municipality of Kvinesdal. It is part of the Lister og Mandal prosti (deanery) in the Diocese of Agder og Telemark.

Geography
The long, narrow municipality of Kvinesdal stretches from the mountains in the north, along the Kvinesdalen valley to the Fedafjorden in the south. To the west, Kvinesdal is bordered by Flekkefjord and Sirdal municipalities. To the east, it is bordered by Åseral and Hægebostad. To the south, it is bordered by Lyngdal, and it is bordered by Farsund in the east and south. A small segment of the northern boundary borders Bygland municipality in Agder county.

The river Kvina, which runs through the municipality, is known for its salmon, and salmon fishing is a popular activity.

Two valleys meet in Kvinesdal's center: Vesterdalen (the Western Valley) through which flows the river Kvina and Austerdalen (the Eastern Valley) through which flows the river Litleåna to join the Kvina.

Climate

Population
About 10% of the inhabitants of Kvinesdal are American citizens, and Kvinesdal does enjoy a special relationship with the United States. Every year, the municipality hosts a special festival remembering the days when local people emigrated to the new world.

History

Kvinesdal was home of many prominent characters in the Saga Period. Among them were the Skald Tjodolv the Frode. Frode means one with great knowledge of the history of ancestors. He composed a historic poem for his king Harold Fairhair. His work was later combined into the Heimskringla when it was recorded by Snorri Sturluson.

During the Black Death years of 1350 the farm became deserted, but was back as a working farm again by 1647. It is now a historic site.

The bailiff Stig Bagge, who was granted local leadership from 1536 to 1542 by king Christian III, was an energetic man when he lived at his ancestral home of Eikeland in Kvinesdal. According to the reports of Peder Claussøn Friis, he executed refractory peasants so willingly that the district thought it was to excess; he was the district's bogeyman for many years thereafter. When the bailiff in Nedenes was killed in his bed and rebels came in an unsuccessful attempt to capture and execute Stig, he collected his men and brutally stifled the revolt. Stig himself died by being drawn and quartered by the Dutch when he was caught in piracy or espionage off their coast at Walcheren.

Government
All municipalities in Norway, including Kvinesdal, are responsible for primary education (through 10th grade), outpatient health services, senior citizen services, unemployment and other social services, zoning, economic development, and municipal roads. The municipality is governed by a municipal council of elected representatives, which in turn elect a mayor.  The municipality falls under the Agder District Court and the Agder Court of Appeal.

Municipal council
The municipal council of Kvinesdal is made up of 27 representatives that are elected to four year terms. Currently, the party breakdown is as follows:

Economy
In addition to various small businesses and public services, Kvinesdal's economy is driven in part by hydroelectric power. The Sira-Kvina power company derives hydroelectric power from the Kvina river, in addition to various smaller dams. Eramet is an important local employer that provides work to about 200 persons in producing manganese-alloys. There is also a small tourism industry, with golfing and fishing being the main draws.

Notable residents

 Peder Jacobsen Bøgvald (1762 in Feda – 1829) a sea captain, farmer and politician
 Kristian Marcelius Førland (1891–1978) an artist, lived and painted in Kvinesdal
 Erling Moi (1918 in Kvinesdal – 1944) a Norwegian resistance member in WWII
 Sigbjørn Hølmebakk (1922 in Feda – 1981) a Norwegian author
 Anne Gullestad (1925 in Kvinesdal – 1998) an actress and theatre director 
 Gordon Hølmebakk (1928 in Feda – 2018) a publishing editor, essayist and novelist
 Aril Edvardsen (1938 in Kvinesdal – 2008) an evangelical preacher and missionary, former home now a museum
 Andreas Hompland (born 1946 in Kvinesdal) a social scientist, journalist and non-fiction writer
 Arnfinn Moland (born 1951 in Kvinesdal) a Norwegian historian and writer
 Odd Omland (born 1956) a Norwegian politician, Mayor of Kvinesdal 2003 to 2013
 Per Sverre Kvinlaug (born 1974) a Norwegian politician, Mayor of Kvinesdalin from 2015
 Silvia Moi (born 1978 in Kvinesdal) a Norwegian opera singer 
 Luxus Leverpostei, (Norwegian Wiki) a Norwegian band formed in Kvinesdal in 1991

Sport 
 Ludvig Hunsbedt, (Norwegian Wiki) (born 1961 in Kvinesdal) rallycross driver
 Roger Eskeland (born 1977) a Norwegian football goalkeeper
 Atle Roar Håland (born 1977) a retired footballer with over 300 club caps

See also
Kvinesdal Rock Festival

References

External links

Municipal fact sheet from Statistics Norway 
Kvinesdal Guest House and Hotel 
Official website of Kvinesdal 
 Webcam from Kvinesdal
 Tourist Information
 Kvinesdal Golf Club
 Kvinesdal Rock Festival
 Kvinesdaladressen - din egen @kvinesedal.co addresse!

 
Municipalities of Agder
1838 establishments in Norway